Liana Jojua (born March 22, 1995) is a Georgian mixed martial artist who competed in the Flyweight division. She has formerly fought in the Ultimate Fighting Championship (UFC) and is also the former Fight Nights Global Women's Bantamweight Champion.

Mixed martial arts career

Early career

Jojua's interest in MMA started after watching Gina Carano's fights as a 16-year-old. Coming from a background in Muay Thai, she made her MMA debut in September 2015. After winning her initial fight, she went on a two-fight skid in 2016, but Jojua hit her stride and went on a five-fight win streak which culminated in her winning the FNG Women's Bantamweight Championship against Marina Mokhnatkina.

Ultimate Fighting Championship

Jojua faced Sarah Moras on September 7, 2019, at UFC 242. At the weigh-ins, Moras weighed in at 138 lbs, 2 pounds over the bantamweight non-title fight limit of 136 lbs. Moras was fined 20% of her fight purse to Jojua, and the bout proceeded at catchweight. Jojua lost the fight via TKO in the third round.

Move down to flyweight
Jojua faced Diana Belbiţă at UFC on ESPN: Kattar vs. Ige on July 16, 2020. She won the fight via armbar in first round.

Jojua faced Miranda Maverick on October 24, 2020  at UFC 254. She lost the fight via technical knockout in round one.

Jojua was expected to face Cortney Casey on August 21, 2021, at UFC on ESPN 29. However, Jojua was forced out of the fight due to visa issues. The matchup was rescheduled at UFC Fight Night 197 on November 13, 2021. At the weigh-ins, Jojua weighed in at 128.5 pounds, two and a half pounds over the flyweight non-title fight limit. The bout proceeded at a catchweight with Jojua fined 30% of her purse, which went to her opponent Casey. Jojua lost the bout via unanimous decision.

After the loss, it was announced that Jojua was released from UFC.

Post UFC 
Jojua made her first appearance post UFC release and faced Dariya Zheleznyakova on May 20, 2022 at Ares FC 6. She lost by the way of unanimous decision.

Personal life

She is a teacher and graduated from Moscow State Pedagogical University. She also has a secondary musical education in vocals and piano.

Championships and accomplishments 
Fight Nights Global
FNG Women's Bantamweight Championship.

Mixed martial arts record

|-
|Loss
|align=center|8–6
|Dariya Zheleznyakova
|Decision (unanimous)
|Ares FC 6
|
|align=center|3
|align=center|5:00
|Paris, France
|
|-
|Loss
|align=center|8–5
|Cortney Casey
|Decision (unanimous)
|UFC Fight Night: Holloway vs. Rodríguez
|
|align=center|3
|align=center|5:00
|Las Vegas, Nevada, United States
|
|-
| Loss
| align=center|8–4
| Miranda Maverick
| TKO (doctor stoppage)
| UFC 254
| 
| align=center|1
| align=center|5:00 
| Abu Dhabi, United Arab Emirates
|
|-
| Win
| align=center|8–3
| Diana Belbiţă
|Submission (armbar)
|UFC on ESPN: Kattar vs. Ige 
|
|align=center|1
|align=center|2:47
|Abu Dhabi, United Arab Emirates
|
|-
| Loss
| align=center|7–3
| Sarah Moras
|TKO (punches)
|UFC 242 
|
|align=center|3
|align=center|2:26
|Abu Dhabi, United Arab Emirates
|
|-
| Win
| align=center|7–2
| Marina Mokhnatkina
| Decision (majority)
| Fight Nights Global 83: Alibekov vs. Aliev
| 
| align=center| 5
| align=center| 5:00
| Moscow, Russia
|
|-
| Win
| align=center|6–2
| Viktoriya Shalimova
| Submission (heel hook)
|Emir FC: Selection 1
| 
| align=center|1
| align=center|0:28
| Moscow, Russia
|
|-
| Win
| align=center| 5–2
| Karina Vasilenko
|Submission (armbar)
|Fight Nights Global 71: Mineev vs. Michailidis
|
|align=center| 1
|align=center| 4:15
|Moscow, Russia
| 
|-
| Win
| align=center| 4–2
| Tao Li
| Submission (armbar)
| Kunlun Fight MMA 7
| 
| align=center| 1
| align=center| 3:14
| Beijing, China
|
|-
| Win
| align=center| 3–2
| Valeria Pak
| Submission (armbar)
| SLMMA 7: Ivanov vs. Karapetyan
| 
| align=center| 2
| align=center| N/A
| Moscow, Russia
| 
|-
| Loss
| align=center| 2–2
| Na Liang
| Submission (rear-naked choke)
| WLF E.P.I.C. 7
| 
| align=center| 2
| align=center| N/A
| Zhengzhou, China
| 
|-
| Loss
| align=center| 2–1
| Zamzagul Fayzallanova
| Decision (split)
| Alash Pride: Atyrau the Beautiful
| 
| align=center| 3
| align=center| 5:00
| Atyrau, Kazakhstan
| 
|-
| Win
| align=center| 2–0
| Tatyana Pevneva
| TKO (punches)
| Octagon Fighting Sensation 5
| 
| align=center| 1
| align=center| 3:07
| Yaroslavl, Russia
|
|-
| Win
| align=center| 1–0
| Ekaterina Golovatova
| Submission (armbar)
| Kumite Fight 4
| 
| align=center| 3
| align=center| N/A
| Moscow, Russia
|

See also 
 List of female mixed martial artists

References

External links 
  
 

1995 births
Living people
People from Tbilisi
Female mixed martial artists from Georgia (country)
Flyweight mixed martial artists
Bantamweight mixed martial artists
Mixed martial artists utilizing Muay Thai
Mixed martial artists utilizing wrestling
Mixed martial artists utilizing kūdō
Ultimate Fighting Championship female fighters
Expatriate sportspeople from Georgia (country) in Russia